The Bleeding is the fourth studio album by American death metal band Cannibal Corpse, released on April 12, 1994 through Metal Blade Records. It is the last album featuring singer and founding member Chris Barnes and is the first album featuring guitarist Rob Barrett. According to SoundScan numbers, The Bleeding is the fifth top-selling death metal LP in the United States, amassing over 98,300 copies sold. The Bleeding is also Cannibal Corpse's most successful album to date.

A video was made for the song "Staring Through the Eyes of the Dead". A re-mastered version of The Bleeding is available and features new cover art, a bonus track ("The Exorcist", a Possessed cover) and the music video of "Staring Through the Eyes of the Dead". This music video would later be featured in Beavis and Butt-Head.

Musical style 
This album signified a few changes for Cannibal Corpse, primarily the change in speed. The reason for this was because Barnes had decided he wanted to pursue a different musical angle. For this album, he chose a more "groove" style similar to what he was doing in Six Feet Under over Cannibal Corpse's previous material which focused more on blast beats and speed. Vocally on The Bleeding, Barnes had also decided to go for a more "decipherable" approach instead of his previously inhuman grunting he had executed on previous Cannibal Corpse albums. 

The album is also notable for a much more technical approach for the guitar work, and a more prominent bass.

Cover art 
The original 1994 cover art, a departure for a Cannibal Corpse album, appeared to depict a tapestry of raw flesh and muscle, rather than it featuring graphic violence. The uncensored cover art for the 2006 reissue, however, reveals the original artwork was merely a part of a greater whole. In the reissue artwork, a man is standing in an intimate gathering of zombies, with an expression of ecstasy on his face. The man has been stripped of skin from the chest down. The corpses are entwined with a veiny, blueish growth that is reminiscent of a root system. The exposed muscle and bone of the man's lower body exhibits a fresh growth of this ropey-material, suggesting he is becoming one of them. The original 1994 cover art was simply a close-up of the skinless ribcage and musculature of that man's midsection.

Reception 

"Pushed the envelope in every imaginable way, from cover art to song titles to the music itself. [...] Scott Burns gives the album a wonderful sheen that instantly sets Cannibal Corpse apart from most of the other death metal bands out there [...] The riffs absolutely grind, just as the rhythms pulverize and the vocals thunder. [...] one of the standout death metal albums of the mid-'90s".

Track listing

Credits 
Writing, performance and production credits are adapted from the album liner notes.

Personnel

Cannibal Corpse 
 Chris Barnes – vocals
 Rob Barrett – lead guitar
 Jack Owen – rhythm guitar
 Alex Webster – bass
 Paul Mazurkiewicz – drums

Production 
 Scott Burns – production, recording, engineering, mixing, mastering

Artwork and design 
 Vincent Locke – cover art
 Brian Ames – design
 Frank White – photography
 Joe Giron – photography

Studios 
 Morrisound Recording, Tampa, FL, USA – recording, mixing
 Fullersound – mastering

References

External links 
 
 The Bleeding at Metal Blade Records

1994 albums
Cannibal Corpse albums
Metal Blade Records albums
Albums produced by Scott Burns (record producer)
Albums recorded at Morrisound Recording